Route 11 is a provincial highway in northeastern New Brunswick, Canada. The  road runs from Moncton to the Quebec border, near Campbellton, at the Matapédia Bridge, following the province's eastern and northern coastlines.

Between Shediac Bridge and Miramichi, and between Bathurst and Campbellton, it is a two-lane road with some sections designed as a super two expressway. The highway is twinned for 7 kilometres in the Shediac region near the Route 15 interchange.

Route description 

At Shediac, Route 11 departs Route 15 and turns northward, where its exit numbers are reset. The route passes through the communities of Shediac Cape, intersecting Route 134, and crosses the Shediac River. The highway then enters Cocagne by crossing the Cocagne River. Intersecting with Route 535, the route continues through Ward Corner passing McKees Mills and Saint-François-de-Kent at the intersection of Route 115. The route crosses the Little Bouctouche River, then the Bouctouche River as it enters Bouctouche.

From Bouctouche, Route 11 continues north to Richibucto as well as Kouchibouguac National Park.  The highway reverts to a 2-lane uncontrolled access highway between the national park and the city of Miramichi to the northwest. The highway crosses the Miramichi River in the Miramichi borough of Chatham on the Centennial Bridge with Route 8.

Immediately after crossing the Miramichi River, Route 11 exits the right of way, leaving Route 8 alone on the super two. Route 11 continues on a 2-lane uncontrolled access highway northeast along the coast of Miramichi Bay and the Gulf of St. Lawrence as it runs around the perimeter of the Acadian Peninsula.  Through this region, Route 11 typically forms the main street through most of the coastal towns and settlements such as Neguac, Caraquet, Bertrand, Grande-Anse, and Stonehaven.  The only exception is a Super 2 controlled access bypass of the town of Tracadie-Sheila.

Route 11 has another interchange with Route 8 at Bathurst, where the latter terminates.  Route 11 becomes a super two controlled-access highway from Bathurst, running northwest several kilometres inland from the coast of Chaleur Bay to Glencoe, west of the city of Campbellton.  Near Glencoe, Route 11 intersects Route 17 and turns north onto a 2-lane local road toward Tide Head. The highway turns west to follow the Restigouche River and terminates at the Matapédia Bridge, which crosses the river and connects to Quebec Route 132 in Matapédia, Quebec.

History 

Since the late 1960s, Route 11 has received several upgrades and re-designations as it progresses towards becoming an expressway.

The most significant upgrade to the entire highway route along the east coast of New Brunswick was the opening of the Centennial Bridge which replaced a ferry service and bypassed the town of Chatham in 1967.

In 1973 a new 4-lane expressway opened between Moncton and Shediac, which was then referred to as the Shediac Four-Lane Highway or Shediac Expressway (it was subsequently numbered Route 15 and is known as the Veterans Memorial Highway). Prior to this new expressway, Route 11 followed the Shediac Road from Shediac to Moncton, terminating at Route 2, the Trans-Canada Highway in Lakeville.  Route 11's southern terminus was then changed to the current interchange at Route 15 in Shediac.

Controlled access Super 2 expressway sections on Route 11 were completed during the 1970s in Bathurst and the Campbellton-Dalhousie area, as well as between Shediac and Bouctouche.

During the 1980s and into the early 1990s, two long stretches of Super 2 expressway were completed on Route 11; one running from Bouctouche to Kouchibouguac National Park (bypassing Richibucto), and another running between Bathurst and Charlo, where the existing Super 2 section running east from Campbellton ended. The Super 2 section in Bathurst was also extended eastward past Salmon Beach at the city's east end.

A bypass of Tracadie-Sheila opened to traffic in 2003. Also, an extension to that existing bypass was done in 2009, linking the northern end and Six-Roads, near Pokemouche.

A bypass of Caraquet opened to traffic in 2016. Also going south from exiting Route 11 from Portage Road to Bertrand. The 13 km construction started in 2013, then finished in 2016.

In 2017, work was completed on a new interchange between Route 11 and 15 in Shediac, and 7 kilometres of twinned highway. 

Currently, two other sections of highway are being twinned. The first is from the south side of the Shediac River to the Cocagne River, and the second from the north side of the Cocagne River to the Little Bouctouche River, meaning the highway will revert to two lanes across the Cocagne River on the current bridge.

Major intersections

See also 
List of New Brunswick provincial highways

References 

011
011
011
011
011
011
Bouctouche
Caraquet
Transport in Bathurst, New Brunswick
Transport in Campbellton, New Brunswick
Transport in Miramichi, New Brunswick
1920s establishments in New Brunswick